KCNZ-CD, virtual channel 28 (UHF digital channel 21), is a low-powered, Class A LATV-affiliated television station licensed to San Francisco, California, United States and serving the San Francisco Bay Area. Owned by CNZ Communications, LLC, it is sister to Grit affiliate KOFY-TV (channel 20) and low-power station KQRM-LD. The three stations share transmitter facilities atop San Bruno Mountain.

History
KCNZ-CD was founded on April 25, 1986, with an original construction permit granted to National Innovative Programming Network. Initially assigned to Palo Alto and Los Altos, California, and given callsign K30BI, the station's construction permit was modified and extended several times. In August 1990, Channel America acquired the station, but sold it again in July 1992 to Polar Broadcasting, who finally licensed the station on May 3, 1994. By this time, the station had been assigned to San Francisco, Oakland and San Jose.

K30BI (referred to as "KBI-TV"), was formerly affiliated with The Box, a 24-hour-a-day music network, and aired classic television during the day. Eventually, the station changed affiliations to HSN. Its call letters were changed to KBIT-LP shortly after. The station also relocated to channel 28 to make way for KQED's digital signal on channel 30.

KBIT received Class A status on August 27, 2001, and assumed the call sign KFTL-CA in February 2004 after being taken over by Family Stations, Inc. Family Stations previously used the KFTL call sign on analog channel 64, licensed to Stockton, which is now UniMás owned-and-operated station KTFK-DT.

KFTL-CA flash cut to digital on June 27, 2009; its call sign was changed to KFTL-CD.

Family Stations sold KFTL-CD to LocusPoint Networks in November 2012.

The station was purchased by CNZ Communications subsidiary Poquito Mas Communications in mid-2017 and changed the call sign to KCNZ-CD on August 7, 2017.

Digital channels
The station's digital signal is multiplexed:

See also
 KEAR (AM)
 KEBR (FM)

References

Low-power television stations in the United States
Television channels and stations established in 1994
CNZ-CD
1994 establishments in California
LocusPoint Networks